Confesiones is Monchy & Alexandra's second studio album. It was released on March 12, 2002.

Track listing

Charts

Weekly charts

Year-end charts

References

http://music.yahoo.com/release/134018 - Yahoo! Music

2002 albums
Monchy & Alexandra albums